Eupithecia montavoni is a moth in the  family Geometridae. It is found in Tanzania.

References

Moths described in 1990
montavoni
Moths of Africa